Saleem Borhot (born June 28, 1985) is a former professional Canadian football defensive back. He last played for the Calgary Stampeders of the Canadian Football League. He was drafted twelfth overall by the Edmonton Eskimos in the 2010 CFL Draft and signed a three-year contract plus an option year with the team on May 14, 2010. He played university football for the Saint Mary's Huskies.

References

1985 births
Living people
Canadian football defensive backs
Edmonton Elks players
Canadian football people from Calgary
Saint Mary's Huskies football players
Calgary Stampeders players
Players of Canadian football from Alberta